The TGV M ("M" for modular, also known as the Avelia Horizon) is a high-speed passenger train designed and produced by Alstom. It has a broadly similar design to the TGV Duplex sets, with bi-level carriages and a push–pull configuration with a power car on either end. However, it is more energy efficient and provides lower operating costs.

Development of the TGV M originated with SNCF's launch of a program to procure a new generation of high-speed trains in 2015. In May 2016, the Alstom-headed Speedinnov joint venture was selected as the winning bidder for the program; on 7 September 2016, SNCF and Alstom signed an agreement to design and build the new trains. In July 2018, SNCF placed a €2.7 billion order for 100 trainsets, then referred to as the Avelia Horizon. Production of the first bodyshells commenced in mid-2020; two years later, dynamic testing was underway. The TGV M is expected to enter service with the French train operator SNCF in TGV service in 2024; deliveries will continue into the 2030s.

History 
In 2015, SNCF launched a program to select a supplier for a new generation of high-speed trainsets, to be designed as a joint venture with the manufacturer. Amongst its requirements, SNCF specified that the new trains be at least 20% less expensive to purchase than their predecessors while possessing lower operating costs as well. Planners were reportedly keen to minimize the lifetime costs of rolling stock so that cheaper tickets could be offered.

Around this time, the profitability of France's railway was under pressure from a combination of budget airlines, car sharing, and long-distance bus operators; in response, the French government was proactive in its efforts to reorient long-distance travelers towards its railways. Additional support for the program came via the European Commission's Europe 2020 strategy. The French government agency Ademe partnered with the rolling stock manufacturer Alstom to form the SpeedInnov joint venture, which submitted a bid for the SNCF's program. The submission was for a new train that would be one part of a broader family of high-speed equipment that Alstom would pursue the sales of globally; this philosophy was a significant shift from that of all previous TGV orders, which had involving rolling stock being built specifically to suit the French market. Alongside new technology, many existing features from the company's prior high-speed trains were also reused.

SpeedInnov was selected as the winning bid, enabling work to commence in May 2016. On 7 September 2016, SNCF and Alstom signed an agreement to design and build the trains, with the design phase scheduled to be complete by the end of 2017 and an entry into service in 2022. Thereafter, an 18 month development period was undertaken. During this time, the new trainset's design was defined after examining various conceptual arrangements; various recent innovations were also evaluated for their potential inclusion, the benefits and cost of such inclusions being individually discussed in detail with SNCF.

By July 2018, the design was complete and branded Avelia Horizon by the manufacturer. That same month, SNCF placed a €2.7 billion order for 100 trainsets; this order was accompanied by options to potentially change the quantity on order as well as a maintenance package. SNCF observed that the unit costs of the new train were 20 percent less than the older TGV Duplex. Economic consequences of this order include the creation of 4,000 new jobs across the French railway sector, largely within the manufacturing sector via the engagement of ten of Alstom’s facilities in France over a ten year period; it was also promoted as boosting SNCF's productivity, controlling its costs, and boosting market share.

Between 2018 and 2022, the detailed design of the train was undertaken, along with the preparation of production, and the necessary steps towards its certification to permit its operation. In July 2020, Alstom announced that it had started manufacturing bodyshells for the TGV M at its plant in La Rochelle; static testing of the first vehicles started in summer 2021 while dynamic testing commenced one year later. The first test phase began in the Czech Republic in December 2022 and is scheduled to continue until summer 2023.

Completed TGV M trains are scheduled to enter service with SNCF sometime in 2024, while deliveries are expected to continue through to 2033. In August 2022, SNCF announced that it has exercised an option for 15 additional quad-current TGV M trainsets for international services valued at €590m.

Design 
The TGV M is a high speed train that is promoted as being a fully French design. Furthermore, it is also one member of a wider family of high speed trains, referred to as Avelia, that has been developed for the global high speed rail market. In terms of its basic configuration, it is a push–pull trainset, comprising power cars at both ends along with between seven and nine bilevel passenger cars in an articulated arrangement.

The TGV M has been designed to be readily adaptable. It is outfitted with a modular interior that permits the operator to adapt the same basic design to suit various types of passenger experiences and market trends. It is possible to rapidly reconfigure an individual coach or train; reportedly, first-class coaches can be converted into second class coaches within half a day. Features such as luggage storage, bike racks, and additional seating can be added or removed when appropriate. When outfitted with the highest capacity interior layout, each trainset is capable of carrying up to 740 instead of the current 634 passengers.

The TGV M will be the first high speed train in SNCF service to have complete digital connectivity, provisioned via an optimised onboard internet network that is reportedly capable of integrating future innovations. Amongst other benefits, this shall facilitate on-board WiFi provision along with real-time passenger information displays throughout the train. An intelligently-managed air conditioning system provides precision climate control for greater comfort; airflow is managed via a series of ceiling vents. Via a series of rotating and lifting platforms, passengers with mobility impairments are capable of independent movement through the coaches. SNCF has stated that every area of the train will be designed with accessibility in mind for all travellers, including fully independent boarding.

A 20 percent reduction in energy consumption is attributable to the effectiveness of its regenerative braking. In addition, each trainset is composed almost entirely of recyclable materials, the use of more eco-friendly materials resulted in a 37 percent reduction in the TGV M's carbon footprint over that of its predecessors. Via the use of remote diagnostic systems, which facilitates the adoption of predictive maintenance practices, a 30 percent reduction in maintenance costs has been claimed by the manufacturer. Furthermore, a large proportion of the components used benefit from an optimised design that shall simplify maintenance procedures and facilitate longer intervals between maintenance actions.

See also 

 Avelia Liberty
 Talgo AVRIL
 TGV Duplex

References 

TGV trainsets
Electric multiple units with locomotive-like power cars
Double-decker high-speed trains
Alstom multiple units
1500 V DC multiple units of France
3000 V DC multiple units
15 kV AC multiple units
25 kV AC multiple units